Janee is a feminine given name. Notable people with the name include:

 Janée Bennett (born circa 1986), English musician
 Janee Michelle (born 1947), American actor
 Janee Munroe (1923–2006), American violinist

English feminine given names
Feminine given names